Lars Erik Spets (born April 2, 1985) is a Norwegian professional ice hockey player, who last played for Vålerenga in the GET-ligaen.  He is well known for being offensively gifted and for his long dark hair.

Club career

Early career
He started his career with Lillehammer in the 2002–03 GET-ligaen season, where he played two seasons before moving to Trondheim Black Panthers before the 2004–05 season.

Moving abroad
In 2005, he signed with the Swedish SEL-team Brynäs, where he played two and a half seasons before moving to Germany and the Füchse Duisburg of the DEL in early 2008.

Back home
On 30 September 2008, Spets decided to move back to Norway to play for Vålerenga Ishockey. While there, he was teammates with his older brother, Knut Henrik Spets.  In 2009, he won the GET-ligaen championship and was named playoff MVP after scoring 17 points in 17 games.  Spets was traded to Lørenskog in 2010.  Spets also has a younger brother named Vegard who played most of his junior career with Lillehammer but will play for Rosenborg starting in the 2011-12 season.

International career
Spets has played for the Norway national ice hockey team since 2005. He has also played in national youth teams from the age of 17.  In 2010, he played for Norway at the Winter Olympics in Vancouver, British Columbia, Canada.

Career statistics

Regular season and playoffs

International

References

External links
 

1985 births
Living people
Brynäs IF players
Füchse Duisburg players
Ice hockey players at the 2010 Winter Olympics
Lillehammer IK players
Lørenskog IK players
Norwegian expatriate ice hockey people
Norwegian ice hockey left wingers
Olympic ice hockey players of Norway
Sportspeople from Lillehammer
Trondheim Black Panthers players
Vålerenga Ishockey players
Norwegian expatriate sportspeople in Sweden
Norwegian expatriate sportspeople in Germany